Roshni Nadar Malhotra (born 1980/81) is an Indian billionaire businesswoman and the chairperson of 
HCL Technologies. She is the first woman to lead a listed IT company in India. She is the only child of HCL founder and billionaire businessman Shiv Nadar. In 2019, she is ranked 54th on the Forbes World's 100 Most Powerful Women list. According to IIFL Wealth Hurun India Rich List (2019), Roshni is the richest woman in India.
In 2020, she is ranked 55th on the Forbes World's 100 Most Powerful Women. She is also the CEO of HCL Corporation,   the holding company of all HCL Group entities.

Early life  
Roshni Nadar grew up in Delhi, studied in Vasant Valley School and graduated from Northwestern University majoring in Communication with a focus on Radio/TV/Film. She earned an MBA from the Kellogg School of Management.

Career 
She worked in various companies as a producer before joining HCL. Within a year of her joining HCL, she was elevated as executive director and CEO of HCL Corporation. She subsequently became the chairperson of HCL Technologies, after her father Shiv Nadar stepped down.

Humanitarian initiatives 
Prior to becoming CEO of the HCL Corporation, Roshni Nadar was a trustee of the Shiv Nadar Foundation, which runs the not-for-profit Sri Sivasubramaniya Nadar College of Engineering in Chennai. She had also been involved in brand building across the HCL Group. Nadar is chairperson of VidyaGyan Leadership Academy, a leadership academy for the economically underprivileged.  She set up 'The Habitats' trust that aims at protecting India's natural habitats and indigenous species in a bid to create and conserve sustainable ecosystems.

Personal life 
Nadar is a trained classical musician. In 2010, she married Shikhar Malhotra, vice chairman of HCL Healthcare. They have two sons, Armaan (born 2013) and Jahaan (born 2017).

Awards and recognition

References

External links
Roshni Nadar Malhotra on Forbes

Living people
Businesspeople in software
Indian chief executives
Kellogg School of Management alumni
Northwestern University School of Communication alumni
Indian women chief executives
Businesspeople from Delhi
Businesswomen from Delhi
21st-century Indian businesswomen
21st-century Indian businesspeople
Year of birth missing (living people)
1980s births